Shayna Andrea Baszler (born August 8, 1980) is an American professional wrestler, kickboxer and former mixed martial artist. She is currently signed to WWE, where she performs on the SmackDown brand. Baszler is a former two-time and longest combined-reigning NXT Women's Champion and a two-time WWE Women's Tag Team Champion with Nia Jax.

Baszler was trained in mixed martial arts (MMA) by former UFC fighter Josh Barnett and in catch wrestling by Billy Robinson. She had her first professional MMA fight in 2006 and gained recognition in the following years for the use of her hammerlock submission set-up while on her back; a set-up which she has used to submit several opponents, including Roxanne Modafferi. In an audio interview on the Sherdog Radio Network, she dubbed the submission, which she created in training, as the "Shwing." Baszler was signed in 2013 by the UFC to participate on their reality television series The Ultimate Fighter – she would go on to have two professional bouts (0-2) in the company. In 2015, she was cut from the UFC and started her professional wrestling career that same year, again receiving training from Barnett. Baszler has an overall MMA record of 15 wins and 11 losses, with 13 wins by submission.

Martial arts background and persona 
Baszler, a Khun Kru in the Muay Thai Kickboxing association and a Brazilian jiu-jitsu brown belt, wanted to begin incorporating Josh Barnett's catch wrestling into her MMA training. This proved to be somewhat difficult because she could not train with Barnett in Southern California, so Barnett wrote a syllabus and filmed a video to teach her the step-by-step techniques and concepts of catch wrestling and give her tips on how to improve her verbal skills.

Barnett suggested that Baszler carry an electric guitar to the cage to show that she was outspoken. Baszler reluctantly agreed, and the guitar became a signature of her rockstar-like persona. Later, Barnett gave Baszler "The Queen of Spades" nickname due to her ability to perform card tricks – the card magic nickname also gives a nod to her "submission magic". Baszler refers to her fans as the "Queen's Army."

Mixed martial arts career

Early career (20062007) 
Baszler faced Amanda Buckner at MFC: USA vs. Russia 3 on June 3, 2006. She lost the fight by TKO in the third round.

She faced Samantha Gavere at NFF: The Breakout on March 10, 2007. She won the fight by kimura submission in the first round.

Elite XC and Strikeforce (20072010) 

Baszler debuted for EliteXC at a ShoXC event on July 27, 2007. She submitted veteran Jan Finney with a first-round armbar and repeated the feat three months later against Jennifer Tate. After defeating Keiko Tamai with an impressive Twister submission at a third ShoXC event, Baszler moved up to the main EliteXC cards.

Baszler next faced Cris Cyborg on CBS television at EliteXC: Unfinished Business on July 26, 2008. She lost the fight via TKO in the second round.

Following EliteXC's closure, Baszler debuted for Strikeforce at Strikeforce Challengers: Villasenor vs. Cyborg on June 19, 2009 in a fight against Sarah Kaufman, but lost by unanimous decision.

Various promotions (20102012, 2017) 
Baszler entered the Freestyle Cage Fighting Women's Bantamweight Grand Prix at FCF 39 on January 30, 2010 in Shawnee, Oklahoma. She submitted Megumi Yabushita with a twister submission in the first round of their quarterfinal bout. It was the second time that Baszler had won an MMA fight with the unique submission. Baszler faced late replacement Alexis Davis in the second round of the FCF tournament at FCF 40 on March 27, 2010. She defeated Davis by unanimous decision. Baszler was scheduled to face Jan Finney in the tournament final at FCF 43 on June 12, 2010. However, Finney withdrew in order to compete in Strikeforce and Baszler faced Adrienna Jenkins instead. Baszler defeated Jenkins by first-round armbar to become FCF Women's Bantamweight Grand Prix Champion.

On November 19, 2010, Baszler faced Elaina Maxwell at The Cage Inc.: Battle at the Border 7. Baszler defeated Maxwell by submission due to a kneebar in the first round to become the first TCI Women's 140 lbs Champion.

Baszler was scheduled to defend her TCI title in a rematch with Alexis Davis at The Cage Inc.: Battle at the Border 10 on July 30, 2011. However, the fight was canceled after Davis signed with Strikeforce.

Baszler agreed to face Kelly Kobold in a rematch at Cage Fighting Xtreme: Spring Brawl on April 21, 2012. However, it was announced on March 16 that the event had been canceled.

On February 25, 2017, Baszler was defeated by Reina Miura at Deep Jewels 15. This marked Baszler's last MMA fight.

Invicta Fighting Championships (20122013) 
On April 28, it was announced that Baszler would face Sara McMann in the main event of Invicta FC 2: Baszler vs. McMann. The event took place on July 28, 2012. In a back-and-forth affair, Baszler lost the fight in what was considered to be a controversial unanimous decision. The bout was named Invicta's Fight of the Night.

Baszler faced Sarah D'Alelio at Invicta FC 3: Penne vs. Sugiyama on October 6, 2012. She defeated D'Alelio via submission due to a rear naked choke early in round two.

Baszler faced Alexis Davis in a rematch at Invicta FC 4: Esparza vs. Hyatt on January 5, 2013. She was defeated via technical submission due to a rear naked choke in round three. The bout was named Invicta's Fight of the Night.

Ultimate Fighting Championship (20132015)

The Ultimate Fighter 
In August 2013, it was announced that Baszler was one of the fighters selected to be on The Ultimate Fighter: Team Rousey vs. Team Tate. In her fight to get into the TUF house, Baszler faced Colleen Schneider and won via an armbar submission in the first round. Baszler was then selected by Ronda Rousey as the first team pick and the first fight of the season against Julianna Peña. Baszler lost to Peña after tapping out due to a rear naked choke in the second round.

Baszler was expected to face Sarah Kaufman at The Ultimate Fighter Nations Finale. However, on April 2, 2014, she pulled out of the bout due to an injury.

Early fights and departure 
For her promotional debut, Baszler faced Bethe Correia on August 30, 2014, at UFC 177. She lost the fight via TKO in the second round.

Baszler faced Amanda Nunes on March 21, 2015 at UFC Fight Night 62. She lost the fight via TKO in the first round after taking multiple leg kicks. After going 0–2 with the promotion, Baszler was released from the organization and went on to pursue a professional wrestling career.

Professional wrestling career

Independent circuit (2015–2017) 
On March 1, 2015 at Ring of Honor's 13th Anniversary Show, Baszler accompanied reDRagon to the ring for their ROH World Tag Team Championship defense. After they won, she helped cut a celebratory promo, where they described her addition to the team as "[finding] our Ringo". After training under Josh Barnett, Baszler made her professional wrestling debut on September 26, 2015, losing to Cheerleader Melissa for Quintessential Pro Wrestling (QPG) in Reno, Nevada. Baszler was attacked by Nicole Matthews after the match, setting up a future match between them. On October 30, Baszler defeated Matthews in their first match against each other, but lost in their second meeting, a KO or submission only match in January 2016, won by Matthews via KO in just over 9 minutes. On July 17, Baszler defeated Ruby Raze to become the Premier Women's Champion at Premier XIII.

Baszler debuted for Absolute Intense Wrestling (AIW) in April 2016, losing to Mia Yim. She returned to the promotion in June, defeating Veda Scott, and then again the following month, defeating Annie Social. On September 9, she defeated Heidi Lovelace to become the AIW Women's Champion. She made her first successful defense against Britt Baker on November 5, and again retained the championship against Ray Lyn and Ayzali in a three-way match for Rise Wrestling on November 10. She once again retained the championship against Lovelace in a rematch on November 25.

In June 2016, Baszler made her debut for Shimmer Women Athletes at Volume 81, defeating Rhia O'Reilly. She defeated Solo Darling at volume 82, and at volume 83, she unsuccessfully challenged Nicole Savoy for the Heart Of Shimmer Championship. She once again defeated Mia Yim at Volume 85. She returned in November, teaming with Mercedes Martinez in a loss to The Aussie Squad (Kellie Skater and Shazza McKenzie) at volume 86. At Volume 87, she faced Kay Lee Ray, Heidi Lovelace and Vanessa Kraven in a fatal four-way match, won by Kraven. At Volume 88, she lost to Shazza McKenzie by disqualification. At Volume 89, she once again lost to McKenzie in a no disqualification match. At Volume 90, she once again defeated Heidi Lovelace.

World Wonder Ring Stardom (2015, 2017) 
In October 2015, Baszler worked two events for Japanese promotion World Wonder Ring Stardom, during their American tour in Covina, California, first teaming with Brittany Wonder and Datura in a loss to Oedo Tai (Act Yasukawa, Kris Wolf and Kyoko Kimura), and unsuccessfully challenging Cheerleader Melissa for the GRPW Lady Luck Championship two days later. She returned to the promotion in January 2017, this time touring Japan. She made her debut on January 3, teaming with Mayu Iwatani and Jungle Kyona to defeat Sumie Sakai, Kagetsu and Kyoko Kimura. The following day, she teamed with Nixon Newell and Kay Lee Ray to defeat Iwatani, Kairi Hojo and Konami. The following day, she faced Himomi Mimura and Viper in a triple threat match won by Viper. On January 15, she took part in another triple threat match, this time defeating Momo Watanabe and Jungle Kyona. On January 29, she teamed with Deonna Purrazzo and Christi Jaynes to defeat Kris Wolf, Viper and Kagetsu. On February 23, Baszler unsuccessfully challenged Io Shirai for the World of Stardom Championship.

WWE

NXT Women's Champion (2017–2020) 

On August 28, 2017, Baszler entered the Mae Young Classic tournament promoted by WWE, defeating Zeda in the first round. The following week, Baszler defeated Mia Yim, Candice LeRae, and Mercedes Martinez en route to the final. On September 12, Baszler was defeated in the final of the tournament by Kairi Sane.

Baszler made her NXT debut at a house show on August 10, 2017, where she teamed with The Iconic Duo (Billie Kay and Peyton Royce) to face Kairi Sane, Aliyah, and Dakota Kai in a losing effort. On August 12, she made her singles debut by defeating Zeda. On October 3, WWE officially announced that Baszler had signed with the company and started training at the WWE Performance Center.

On the December 6 episode of NXT, a vignette aired teasing Baszler's televised debut. She made her televised debut by attacking Kairi Sane on the December 27 episode of NXT. On the January 10, 2018 episode of NXT, she made her in-ring debut, defeating Dakota Kai by referee stoppage. Baszler continued to attack Kai until NXT Women's Champion Ember Moon made the save, leading to a title match at NXT TakeOver: Philadelphia on January 27, where Moon defeated Baszler to retain the title, but was attacked by her afterwards. Baszler received another title match against Moon at NXT TakeOver: New Orleans on April 7, where Baszler defeated Moon by technical submission to win the NXT Women's Championship. She then began a feud with Nikki Cross, culminating in a title match at NXT TakeOver: Chicago II on June 16, which Baszler won.

At NXT TakeOver: Brooklyn 4 on August 18, Baszler lost the title to Kairi Sane, ending her reign at 133 days. At Evolution on October 28, she defeated Sane in a rematch to regain the title, becoming the first-ever two-time NXT Women's Champion. Baszler went on to successfully defend her title against Sane at NXT TakeOver: WarGames on November 17, Bianca Belair at NXT TakeOver: Phoenix on January 26, 2019, and in a fatal four-way match against Sane, Belair, and Io Shirai at NXT TakeOver: New York on April 5. Baszler then started a feud with Shirai, retaining her title against Shirai at NXT TakeOver: XXV on June 1 and on the June 26 episode of NXT in a steel cage match to end the feud. At NXT TakeOver: Toronto on August 10, she defeated Mia Yim to retain her title.

On the November 1 episode of SmackDown, Baszler was the first NXT wrestler to invade the show, when she attacked Nikki Cross, Sasha Banks, and SmackDown Women's Champion Bayley; later that night, Baszler joined Triple H and the rest of the NXT roster as they declared war on both Raw and SmackDown, and vowed to win the Survivor Series brand warfare. At NXT TakeOver: WarGames on November 23, Baszler and her team lost against Rhea Ripley and her team in the first ever women's WarGames match. On the next day at Survivor Series, Baszler won the triple threat match against Raw Women's Champion Becky Lynch and SmackDown Women's Champion Bayley to win Survivor Series for the NXT brand. On the December 18 episode of NXT, Baszler lost the championship to Ripley, ending her reign at 416 days, making her the sixth longest reigning women's champion after Sensational Sherri's reign of 441 days. On January 26, 2020, at Royal Rumble, she would enter the women's Royal Rumble match at #30 and go on to eliminate 8 contestants, which tied the record for most eliminations in a women's Royal Rumble match, before being the last woman eliminated by Charlotte Flair, who would win the match. On the January 22 episode of NXT, Baszler defeated Shotzi Blackheart in what would be her final match in NXT.

WWE Women's Tag Team Champion (2020–2021) 
On the February 10 episode of Raw, Baszler made her main roster debut by attacking Raw Women's Champion Becky Lynch, biting the back of Lynch's neck furiously. At Elimination Chamber on March 8, Baszler won the Elimination Chamber match to become the #1 contender for the Raw Women's Championship, while also setting a record by eliminating every other woman. On the first night of WrestleMania 36 on April 4, Baszler failed to win the title from Lynch after a roll-up pin. At Money in the Bank on May 10, Baszler failed to win the briefcase which contained the Raw Women's Championship instead of the contract.

At Payback on August 30, Baszler and Nia Jax defeated Bayley and Sasha Banks to win the WWE Women's Tag Team Championship. They lost the titles to Asuka and Charlotte Flair on December 20 at TLC: Tables, Ladders & Chairs. On January 31, 2021, at the Royal Rumble, Baszler and Jax defeated Asuka and Flair to became record-tying two-time WWE Women's Tag Team Champions. On the second night of WrestleMania 37 on April 11, Baszler and Jax retained the titles against Natalya and Tamina. After multiple singles and tag team matches between the two teams, Baszler and Jax lost the titles to Natalya and Tamina on the May 14 episode of SmackDown.

On the May 31 episode of Raw, Baszler began feuding with Alexa Bliss, claiming that the use of Bliss' "powers" were the reason why Baszler and Jax lost the titles. A match between the two was scheduled for Hell in a Cell on June 20, which Bliss won. Tensions kept rising between Baszler and Jax, and on the September 20 episode of Raw, their alliance ended when she brutally attacked Jax after their match against each other.

Teaming with Natalya (2021–2022) 
As part of the 2021 Draft, Baszler was drafted to the SmackDown brand. In October, Baszler entered the Queen's Crown tournament, where she defeated Dana Brooke in the first round but lost to Doudrop in the semi-finals. She participated in the 5 on 5 Survivor Series elimination match at Survivor Series on November 21, eliminating Rhea Ripley before she was eliminated by Bianca Belair. She also participated in the Royal Rumble match at the namesake event on January 19, 2022, entering at #30 but was eliminated by Charlotte Flair. During this time, Baszler formed a tag team with Natalya and challenged for the WWE Women's Tag Team Championship, leading to a fatal four-way tag team match for the titles on the second night of WrestleMania 38 on April 3, which was won by Sasha Banks and Naomi. On the June 3 episode of SmackDown, Baszler competed in a six-pack challenge to determine the #1 contender for the SmackDown Women's Championship, which was won by Natalya. Baszler failed to qualify for the Money in the Bank ladder match after losing to Raquel Rodriguez on the June 17 episode of SmackDown, and a six-woman elimination match on the June 27 episode of Raw. On the August 5 episode of SmackDown, Baszler won a gauntlet match for the opportunity to face Liv Morgan for the SmackDown Women's Championship at Clash at the Castle on September 3, but failed to win the title at the event.

Alliance with Ronda Rousey (2022-present)
On the October 28 episode of SmackDown, Baszler attacked Natalya in a backstage segment, ending their partnership and aligning with SmackDown Women's Champion and real-life best friend Ronda Rousey in the process. The following week, with Rousey in her corner, Baszler defeated Natalya. At Survivor Series WarGames on November 26, Baszler helped Rousey retain her title against Shotzi.

Other media 
Baszler made her WWE video game debut as a playable character in WWE 2K19, and returned for WWE 2K20. She would also appear in WWE 2K22.

Personal life 

Baszler was born and raised in Sioux Falls, South Dakota. She has German ancestry on her father's side and Chinese ancestry on her mother's side. Baszler attended MidAmerica Nazarene University in Olathe, Kansas, where she majored in religious studies.

Baszler was a key spokesperson in the movement to create a South Dakota athletic commission for combat sports. She once delivered a speech that touched opposing Rep. Steve Hickey, who once labeled MMA as the "child porn" of sports. After visiting Baszler at the Next Edge Academy of Martial Arts, the training place of Baszler, as well as other mixed martial arts fighters and practitioners, Hickey changed his mind about the sport.

Outside of combat sports, Baszler coaches the South Dakota-based roller derby team, the Sioux Falls Roller Dollz and is a certified Emergency Medical Technician (EMT).

Baszler is also a fan of the Warhammer 40,000 franchise and occasionally incorporates the designs of certain Space Marine chapters into her ring gear.

Championships and accomplishments

Mixed martial arts 
 Freestyle Cage Fighting
 FCF Women's Bantamweight Grand Prix Championship (1 time)
 Invicta FC
 Fight of the Night (2 times) vs. Sara McMann, Alexis Davis 
 The Cage Inc.
 TCI Women's 140 lbs Championship (1 time, first)

Submission grappling 
ADCC Submission Wrestling World Championship
ADCC 2007 Submission Wrestling World Championship  Quarterfinalist
 Catch Wrestling Association
 CWA 2016 Frank Gotch World Catch Tournament Gold Medalist
 International Federation of Associated Wrestling Styles
 FILA 2009 Grappling World Championships Senior No-Gi Silver Medalist
 FILA 2009 Grappling World Championships Senior Gi Silver Medalist
 USA Wrestling
 FILA 2011 World Team Trials Senior No-Gi Gold Medalist
 FILA 2009 World Team Trials Senior Gi Gold Medalist
 FILA 2009 World Team Trials Senior No-Gi Gold Medalist
 FILA 2007 World Team Trials Senior No-Gi Bronze Medalist

Professional wrestling 
 Absolute Intense Wrestling
 AIW Women's Championship (1 time)
 DDT Pro-Wrestling
 Ironman Heavymetalweight Championship (1 time)
 New Horizon Pro Wrestling
 IndyGurlz Australian Championship (1 time)
 Global Conflict Shield Tournament (2017)
 Premier Wrestling
 Premier Women's Championship (1 time)
 Pro Wrestling Illustrated
Ranked No. 4 of the top 100 female wrestlers in the PWI Female 100 in 2019
 Ranked No. 24 of the top 50 Tag Teams in the PWI Tag Team 50 in 2021- with Nia Jax
 Quintessential Pro Wrestling
 QPW Women's Championship (1 time)
 Sports Illustrated
 Ranked No. 4 of the top 10 women's wrestlers in 2019
WWE
NXT Women's Championship (2 times)
 Women's Elimination Chamber (2020)
WWE Women's Tag Team Championship (2 times) – with Nia Jax
 NXT Year-End Award (1 time)
 Female Competitor of the Year (2019)

Mixed martial arts record 

|-
| Loss
| align=center | 15–11
| Reina Miura
| Decision (unanimous)
| Deep Jewels 15
| 
| align=center | 2
| align=center | 5:00
| Tokyo, Japan
| 
|-
| Loss
| align=center | 15–10
| Amanda Nunes
| TKO (leg kick)
| UFC Fight Night: Maia vs. LaFlare
| 
| align=center | 1
| align=center | 1:56
| Rio de Janeiro, Brazil
|
|-
| Loss
| align=center | 15–9
| Bethe Correia
| TKO (punches)
| UFC 177
| 
| align=center | 2
| align=center | 1:56
| Sacramento, California, United States
|
|-
| Loss
| align=center | 15–8
| Alexis Davis
| Technical Submission (rear-naked choke)
| Invicta FC 4: Esparza vs. Hyatt
| 
| align=center | 3
| align=center | 0:58
| Kansas City, Kansas, United States
| 
|-
| Win
| align=center | 15–7
| Sarah D'Alelio
| Submission (rear-naked choke)
| Invicta FC 3: Penne vs. Sugiyama
| 
| align=center | 2
| align=center | 0:37
| Kansas City, Kansas, United States
|
|-
| Loss
| align=center | 14–7
| Sara McMann
| Decision (unanimous)
| Invicta FC 2: Baszler vs. McMann
| 
| align=center | 3
| align=center | 5:00
| Kansas City, Kansas, United States
| 
|-
| Win
| align=center | 14–6
| Elaina Maxwell
| Submission (kneebar)
| The Cage Inc.: Battle at the Border 7
| 
| align=center | 1
| align=center | 4:03
| Hankinson, North Dakota, United States
| 
|-
| Win
| align=center | 13–6
| Adrienna Jenkins
| Submission (armbar)
| Freestyle Cage Fighting 43
| 
| align=center | 1
| align=center | 2:12
| Shawnee, Oklahoma, United States
| 
|-
| Win
| align=center | 12–6
| Alexis Davis
| Decision (unanimous)
| Freestyle Cage Fighting 40
| 
| align=center | 3
| align=center | 5:00
| Shawnee, Oklahoma, United States
|
|-
| Win
| align=center | 11–6
| Megumi Yabushita
| Submission (twister)
| Freestyle Cage Fighting 39
| 
| align=center | 1
| align=center | 4:50
| Shawnee, Oklahoma, United States
|
|-
| Loss
| align=center | 10–6
| Sarah Kaufman
| Decision (unanimous)
| Strikeforce Challengers: Villasenor vs. Cyborg
| 
| align=center | 3
| align=center | 5:00
| Kent, Washington, United States
|
|-
| Loss
| align=center | 10–5
| Cris Cyborg
| TKO (punches)
| EliteXC: Unfinished Business
| 
| align=center | 2
| align=center | 2:48
| Stockton, California, United States
|
|-
| Win
| align=center | 10–4
| Keiko Tamai
| Submission (twister)
| ShoXC: Elite Challenger Series
| 
| align=center | 1
| align=center | 2:05
| Friant, California, United States
|
|-
| Win
| align=center | 9–4
| Jennifer Tate
| Submission (armbar)
| ShoXC: Elite Challenger Series
| 
| align=center | 1
| align=center | 0:44
| Santa Ynez, California, United States
|
|-
| Win
| align=center | 8–4
| Jan Finney
| Submission (armbar)
| ShoXC: Elite Challenger Series
| 
| align=center | 1
| align=center | 2:40
| Santa Ynez, California, United States
|
|-
| Win
| align=center | 7–4
| Samantha Gavere
| Submission (kimura)
| NFF: The Breakout
| 
| align=center | 1
| align=center | 1:00
| Minneapolis, Minnesota, United States
|
|-
| Loss
| align=center | 6–4
| Tara LaRosa
| TKO (punches)
| BodogFight: Costa Rica
| 
| align=center | 2
| align=center | 3:15
| Costa Rica
|
|-
| Win
| align=center | 6–3
| Roxanne Modafferi
| Submission (hammerlock)
| MARS: BodogFight
| 
| align=center | 1
| align=center | 1:08
| Tokyo, Japan
|
|-
| Loss
| align=center | 5–3
| Amanda Buckner
| TKO (punches)
| MFC: USA vs Russia 3
| 
| align=center | 3
| align=center | 3:03
| Atlantic City, New Jersey, United States
|
|-
| Win
| align=center | 5–2
| Julie Kedzie
| Submission (armbar)
| Freestyle Combat Challenge 22
| 
| align=center | 1
| align=center | N/A
| Racine, Wisconsin, United States
|
|-
| Loss
| align=center | 4–2
| Amanda Buckner
| Submission (armbar)
| Ring of Fire 20: Elite
| 
| align=center | 1
| align=center | 4:28
| Castle Rock, Colorado, United States
|
|-
| Win
| align=center | 4–1
| Cindy Romero
| TKO (submission to punches)
| UCS: Battle At The Barn 9
| 
| align=center | 1
| align=center | N/A
| Rochester, Minnesota, United States
|
|-
| Win
| align=center | 3–1
| Heather Lobs
| Submission (choke)
| Jungle Madness 2
| 
| align=center | 1
| align=center | 1:51
| Minnesota, United States
|
|-
| Loss
| align=center | 2–1
| Kelly Kobold
| TKO (submission to punches)
| Reality Cage Fighting
| 
| align=center | 2
| align=center | 2:20
| South Dakota, United States
|
|-
| Win
| align=center | 2–0
| Christy Zimmerman
| Submission (armbar)
| Reality Cage Fighting
| 
| align=center | 1
| align=center | N/A
| South Dakota, United States
|
|-
| Win
| align=center | 1–0
| Tina Johnson
| Submission (armbar)
| Reality Cage Fighting
| 
| align=center | 1
| align=center | 1:20
| South Dakota, United States
|

|-
|Loss
|align=center|1–1
| Julianna Peña
| Submission (rear-naked choke)
|rowspan=2|The Ultimate Fighter: Team Rousey vs. Team Tate
| (air date)
|align=center|2
|align=center|3:08
|rowspan=2|Las Vegas, Nevada, United States
|
|-
|Win
|align=center|1–0
| Colleen Schneider
| Submission (armbar)
| (air date)
|align=center|1
|align=center|4:24
|

See also 
 List of female mixed martial artists

References

External links 

 
 
 
 
 Shayna Baszler at Awakening Fighters
 
 

1980 births
American female mixed martial artists
American female professional wrestlers
American people of German descent
American practitioners of Brazilian jiu-jitsu
American sportspeople of Chinese descent
Bantamweight mixed martial artists
Mixed martial artists utilizing catch wrestling
Mixed martial artists utilizing Brazilian jiu-jitsu
Bisexual sportspeople
Bisexual women
Female Brazilian jiu-jitsu practitioners
American LGBT people of Asian descent
LGBT professional wrestlers
LGBT Brazilian jiu-jitsu practitioners
LGBT mixed martial artists
American LGBT sportspeople
Living people
Mixed martial artists from South Dakota
Professional wrestlers from South Dakota
Professional wrestling managers and valets
Ultimate Fighting Championship female fighters
People from Sioux Falls, South Dakota
NXT Women's Champions
21st-century American women
21st-century professional wrestlers
LGBT people from South Dakota
WWE Women's Tag Team Champions
Ironman Heavymetalweight Champions